Bützow Land is an Amt in the district of Rostock, in Mecklenburg-Vorpommern, Germany. The seat of the Amt is in Bützow.

The Amt Bützow Land consists of the following municipalities:
Baumgarten 
Bernitt 
Bützow
Dreetz 
Jürgenshagen 
Klein Belitz 
Penzin 
Rühn
Steinhagen 
Tarnow 
Warnow 
Zepelin

References

Ämter in Mecklenburg-Western Pomerania
Rostock (district)